Joseph Allen Oliver (born 8 September 1924) is an English retired footballer who played as a winger.

Oliver started his career with non-league Crofton Colliery Welfare before joining Derby County in 1947. He scored 2 goals in 17 appearances in total for Derby County before joining Stockport County in 1950, where he went on to score 32 goals in 151 league and cup games. Oliver moved on to Gateshead in 1954, making 153  league and cup appearances and scoring 37 goals in 4 years at the club. Oliver then moved to non-league Ashington in 1958.

Sources

1924 births
Living people
English footballers
Association football midfielders
Derby County F.C. players
Stockport County F.C. players
Gateshead F.C. players
Ashington A.F.C. players
English Football League players